Jai Kumar Singh is an Indian politician from Rohtas district of Bihar, India. He served as Minister of Department of Science and Technology, Bihar and is Member of Bihar Legislative Assembly representing Dinara vidhan sabha constituency since 2005.

Political career 
Singh made entry into politics in 2001 as member of Rohtas district council. In 2005 Bihar Legislative Assembly election, he won from Dinara Vidhan sabha constituency. Again in 2010 Bihar Legislative Assembly election and 2015 Bihar Legislative Assembly election, he won from the same constituency. He also held the position as Minister of Cooperative Department of Government of Bihar in 2014. Currently, he is Minister of Department of Science and Technology, Bihar.

See also
List of science and technology ministers of Bihar

References 

State cabinet ministers of Bihar
Janata Dal (United) politicians
Bihar MLAs 2005–2010
Bihar MLAs 2010–2015
Bihar MLAs 2015–2020
1963 births
Living people
People from Rohtas District